South Gloucestershire Council is the local authority for the a unitary authority of South Gloucestershire, England. It was created on 1 April 1996, covering the area of the abolished Kingswood and Northavon districts, and also taking on the services previously provided by the former Avon County Council in the area.

Political control
Since the first election to the council in 1995 political control of the council has been held by the following parties:

Leadership
The leaders of the council since 1999 have been:

Council elections
1995 South Gloucestershire Council election
1999 South Gloucestershire Council election (New ward boundaries)
2003 South Gloucestershire Council election
2007 South Gloucestershire Council election (New ward boundaries)
2011 South Gloucestershire Council election
2015 South Gloucestershire Council election
2019 South Gloucestershire Council election (New ward boundaries)

By-election results

1995–1999

1999–2003

2003–2007

2007–2011

References

External links
South Gloucestershire Council
South Gloucestershire election results
By-election results

 
South Gloucestershire
Politics of South Gloucestershire District
South Gloucestershire